Ab Bada (also Romanized as Āb Bādā; also known as Āb Bād and Āb Bād-e Do) is a village in Mobarakabad Rural District, in the Central District of Qir and Karzin County, Fars Province, Iran. At the 2006 census, its population was 86, in 22 families.

References 

Populated places in Qir and Karzin County